Statistics of Czechoslovak First League in the 1954 season.

Overview
It was contested by 12 teams, and Spartak Praha Sokolovo won the championship. Jiří Pešek was the league's top scorer with 15 goals.

Stadia and locations

League standings

Results

Top goalscorers

References

Czechoslovakia - List of final tables (RSSSF)

Czechoslovak First League seasons
Czech
Czech
1
1